Aspley Guise railway station serves the village of Aspley Guise in Bedfordshire, England. It is on the BletchleyBedford Marston Vale Line. The station is served by West Midlands Trains local services, operating under the London Northwestern Railway brand.
The services operate using  Class 230 diesel-electric multiple unit trains which are upcycled London Underground D78 Stock. It is one of the seven stations serving the Milton Keynes urban area, albeit the only one located outside the City of Milton Keynes and Buckinghamshire.

In 2016/17, the station was the least used in Bedfordshire.

History
Opened by the London and North Western Railway in October 1905, it became part of the London, Midland and Scottish Railway in the 1923 Grouping. The station passed to the London Midland Region of British Railways on nationalisation in 1948.

It was built initially as one of seven new halts for a steam rail motor service between Bedford & Bletchley inaugurated in the autumn of 1905 and was initially constructed of old sleepers; it temporarily closed for two years (January 1917-May 1919) as a World War 1 economy measure.  Under LMS auspices, it had its platforms rebuilt and these were lengthened again by BR in 1959.

When Sectorisation was introduced in the 1980s, the station was served by Network SouthEast until the Privatisation of British Railways. The initial operating franchise was awarded to Silverlink County; the franchise was transferred to London Midland on 11 November 2007.

Services

Community Rail Partnership
Aspley Guise station, in common with others on the Marston Vale Line, is covered by the Marston Vale Community Rail Partnership, which aims to increase use of the line by involving local people.

Notes

References

Sources

External links

Trainspots: Aspley Guise Station
Station on navigable O.S. map

Railway stations in Bedfordshire
DfT Category F2 stations
Former London and North Western Railway stations
Railway stations in Great Britain opened in 1905
Railway stations in Great Britain closed in 1917
Railway stations in Great Britain opened in 1919
Railway stations served by West Midlands Trains
East West Rail